Andrew Rowland Benedick Thomas (11 October 1904 – 16 May 1985), was an amateur chess player from Devon, England. He taught mathematics at Blundell's School in Tiverton from 1927 until retiring in 1969, and continued to live in the town until his death.

References

1904 births
1985 deaths
English chess players
People from Crosby, Merseyside
Schoolteachers from Devon
Sportspeople from Devon
Game players from Merseyside